The 2015–16 Copa del Rey was the 114th staging of the Copa del Rey (including two seasons where two rival editions were played). Going into the tournament, the winners were assured a place for the 2016–17 UEFA Europa League Group stage. However, since the two finalists, Barcelona and Sevilla, both qualified for the 2016–17 UEFA Champions League, respectively by winning the 2015–16 La Liga title and the 2015–16 Europa League, the cup winner's place in the 2016–17 Europa League group stage instead passed to the fifth-place team in La Liga, Athletic Bilbao.

Barcelona entered as the defending champions after winning the 2014–15 edition. They defeated Sevilla 2–0 in the final, winning their 28th title.

Schedule and format

Notes
Double-match rounds enforced away goals rule, single-match rounds did not.
Games ending in a tie were decided in extra time; and if it persisted, by a penalty shoot-out.
UEFA Europa League qualification: since the Cup winners, Barcelona, qualified for the 2016–17 UEFA Champions League, the 5th and 6th ranked teams in 2015–16 La Liga (always excluding no "UEFA license" and banned clubs), Athletic Bilbao and Celta Vigo, qualified for the Europa League group stage and play-off round respectively.

Qualified teams
The following teams competed in the 2015–16 Copa del Rey.

Twenty teams of 2014–15 La Liga:

Almería
Athletic Bilbao
Atlético Madrid
Barcelona
Celta Vigo
Córdoba
Deportivo La Coruña
Eibar
Elche
Espanyol
Getafe
Granada
Levante
Málaga
Rayo Vallecano
Real Madrid
Real Sociedad
Sevilla
Valencia
Villarreal

21 teams of 2014–15 Segunda División (Barcelona B was excluded for being a reserve team):

Alavés
Albacete
Alcorcón
Girona
Jaén
Las Palmas
Leganés
Llagostera
Lugo
Mallorca
Mirandés
Numancia
Osasuna
Ponferradina
Racing Santander
Real Betis
Sabadell
Sporting Gijón
Valladolid
Tenerife
Zaragoza

24 teams of 2014–15 Segunda División B: the top five teams of each of the four groups (excluding reserve teams) and the four with the highest number of points out of the remaining non-reserve teams:

Barakaldo
Cádiz
Compostela
Cultural Leonesa
Gimnàstic Tarragona
Guijuelo
Guadalajara
Hércules
Huesca
Huracán Valencia
Linense
Lleida Esportiu
Melilla
Murcia
Oviedo
Racing Ferrol
Real Unión
Reus
Tudelano
UCAM Murcia
UD Logroñés
Villanovense

Eighteen teams of 2014–15 Tercera División, champions of each one of the eighteen groups (or at least the ones with the highest number of points within their group since reserve teams were excluded):

Algeciras
Arandina
Ascó
Castellón
Condal
Ebro
Formentera
Jumilla
Laredo
Linares
Mensajero
Mérida
Peña Sport
Pontevedra
Portugalete
Rayo Majadahonda
Talavera de la Reina
Varea

First round
The draw for First and Second round was held on 21 July 2015 at 13:00 CEST in La Ciudad del Fútbol, RFEF headquarters, in Las Rozas, Madrid. In this round, 37 teams from 2015–16 Segunda División B and 5 from 2015–16 Tercera División teams gained entry. In the draw, firstly six teams from Segunda División B received a bye and then, the remaining teams in the league and teams from Tercera División faced according to proximity criteria by next groups:

Barakaldo, UCAM Murcia, Villanovense, Racing Ferrol, UD Logroñés and Huracán Valencia received a bye for the second round.

Second round
In the second round teams from Segunda División played among themselves and teams from Segunda División B and Tercera played separately. Zaragoza received a bye for the third round.

Third round
Huesca received a bye for the Round of 32.

Final phase 
The draw for the Round of 32 was held on October 16, 2015, in La Ciudad del Fútbol. In this round, all La Liga teams entered the competition.

Round of 32 pairings were as follows: the seven remaining teams participating in Segunda División B faced the La Liga teams which qualified for European competitions. The five remaining teams participating in Segunda División faced five La Liga teams which did not qualify for European competitions. The remaining eight La Liga teams faced each other. In matches involving teams from different league tiers, the team in the lower tier played the first leg at home. This rule was also applied in the Round of 16, but not for the Quarter-finals and Semi-finals, in which the order of legs was based on the luck of the draw.

Bracket

Round of 32

|}

First leg

Second leg

Round of 16

|}

First leg

Second leg

Quarter-finals

|}

First leg

Second leg

Semi-finals

|}

First leg

Second leg

Final

Top goalscorers

References

External links
Royal Spanish Football Federation website 
Copa del Rey at LFP website 

2015-16
1